The D. Julius Gaspard House is a historic building located on the hill above downtown Davenport, Iowa, United States. The two-story, Vernacular Greek Revival residence was built into a steep, sloping lot. The narrow two-bay front has its main staircase in a separate enclosed structure on the east side of the house. It is only one of a few examples of this kind of structure in Iowa. The house was built by D. Julius Gaspard, who worked as a stonemason. It has been listed on the National Register of Historic Places since 1983.

References

Houses completed in 1880
Greek Revival houses in Iowa
Houses in Davenport, Iowa
Houses on the National Register of Historic Places in Iowa
National Register of Historic Places in Davenport, Iowa